The Robber of the Sparrow's Nest is an oil painting by the French Rococo artist Antoine Watteau, now in the National Galleries of Scotland, Edinburgh. Variously dated between 1709 and 1716, the painting is a pastoral scene that is one of a few extant arabesques in Watteau's art; it shows a young couple with a dog, sitting at a sparrow's nest; it has been thought to be influenced by Flemish Baroque painting, exactly by Peter Paul Rubens' painting from the Marie de' Medici cycle.

In the 18th century, The Robber of the Sparrow's Nest was once in the collection of Watteau's friend and patron Jean de Jullienne; passing through a number of private owners, it came into possession of the Scottish landscape painter Hugh William Williams by the early 19th century; in 1860, the latter's widow donated the painting to the National Gallery of Scotland.

Exhibition history

Bibliography
 
 
 
 
 
 
 
 
 
 
 
 
 
 
 
  . Published in French as

External links
 The Robber of the Sparrow's Nest at the National Galleries of Scotland's official website

1710s paintings
Paintings by Antoine Watteau
Paintings in the National Galleries of Scotland